Keurboom Park is a park in Rondebosch, Cape Town, in South Africa. It borders the Western Province Sports Club and Rondebosch Boys' High School. It is named after the original Keurboom estate. 

The keurboom is an indigenous tree.

External links
 Keurboom Park Association

Parks in Cape Town
Rondebosch